New South Wales politics takes place in context of a bicameral parliamentary system. 
The main parties are the Liberal and National parties of the governing Coalition and the Australian Labor Party. Other minor political parties include the Greens, Shooters, Fishers and Farmers Party and One Nation, along with multiple independents.

The New South Wales government is sometimes referred to informally as "the bear pit", as a mark of perceived unruly behaviour within the parliamentary chambers, and 'Macquarie Street', a metonym of the street of that name where Parliament House is located, in Sydney's CBD.

State politics

Parliament of New South Wales

The Australian state of New South Wales has a bicameral parliament. The Legislative Assembly (lower house) is composed of 93 members of parliament, each of whom represents a single electorate. The voting system is preferential. Until the mid-1990s, members of the Assembly served for up to four years, until the Greiner government made terms a fixed length of four years. The Legislative Council (upper house) comprises 42 members, who serve terms of 8 years. The King of Australia is represented by the governor, who formally appoints the premier, as nominated by the majority party in the Assembly.

Office holders
The formal chief executive of New South Wales is the governor, who is appointed as the King's representative on the advice of the head of the governing party. The current governor is Margaret Beazley. The governor holds limited reserve powers, but with few exceptions is required by convention to act on the advice of the government.

The Premier of New South Wales is currently Dominic Perrottet of the Liberal Party. The 46th Premier, Perrottet assumed office on 5 October 2021 in a leadership election following the resignation of Gladys Berejiklian. This follows a succession of resignations, as Berejiklian succeeded Mike Baird in 2017, who in turn succeeded Barry O'Farrell in 2014. The Deputy Premier of New South Wales, and current Nationals leader is Paul Toole, who has held this office since 2021, succeeding  John Barilaro, who retired from politics.

Officially opposing the New South Wales government is the opposition Labor Party, currently led by Opposition Leader Chris Minns.

The government is decided every four years by election. The most recent election was held in 2019, with the next in 2023.

Political parties

New South Wales is currently governed by the Liberal Party.  The two main parties are the Liberal Party/National Party Coalition, and the Labor Party. Other currently elected parties in New South Wales politics include the Greens, the Shooters, Fishers and Farmers Party, the Animal Justice Party and One Nation, along with multiple independents.

State party support by region

Liberal 
The Liberals strongest base has always been on the North Shore and Northern Beaches as well as the Hills and Forest districts, creating a 'bloc' on the northern side of Sydney Harbour. The last time the Labor party won an electorate wholly within any of these districts was the electorates of Manly, Wakehurst and Willoughby in the 1978 'Wranslide' election. The electoral districts of North Shore and the single Liberal held electorate of Vaucluse in the Eastern Suburbs are the most affluent areas in the state and have never been lost to the Labor party. The Liberals have consistently held the regional electorates of Albury, Bega and Wagga Wagga.

Nationals 
The Nationals (formally the Country Party) are a party representing country issues and farmers and only generally seek to represent rural and regional electorates. They are ideologically conservative and sit on the centre-right of the political spectrum. Their strongest base within the state has always been the New England, Northern Tablelands, Northern Rivers, Mid North Coast, Riverina and the Central West. The Nationals biggest competitors are the Shooters, Fishers and Farmers and well as local independents from time to time. When there is no incumbent, it is not uncommon for the Liberals to run candidates against the Nationals creating three cornered contests in semi-rural electorates such as Cessnock, Monaro, Goulburn and Wagga Wagga.

Labor
Labor was traditionally strongest in the Inner West, Western Sydney and South Western Sydney however their status has diminished since the late 2000s in the Inner West with the rise of the left-wing Greens in the electorates of Balmain and Newtown. The continued success of the Liberals in Western Sydney has seen Labor unable to recover over the last decade electorates for which they normally held uninterrupted for multiple electoral cycles including Penrith, East Hills and Parramatta. Labor's significant majorities and continual hold-outs with its highest two-party preferred votes are in the electorates with the highest concentration of lower socioeconomic groups such as Mount Druitt, Blacktown and Canterbury. Labor are equally unchallenged in the electorates with known ethnic enclaves such as Lakemba, Cabramatta, Bankstown and Fairfield respectively.

Outside metropolitan Sydney, Labor have consistently recorded majorities in the regions of the Hunter and Central Coast with the Coalition holding only a single electorate in each without interruption, being: Upper Hunter and Terrigal. Labor generally perform well in the Illawarra and in the Far West mining town of Broken Hill.

Greens 
The Greens have solidified support within the Inner West city region of metropolitan Sydney at the expense of Labor. There has been little to no opposition from the Liberals or their predecessors in seats where left-wing candidates have always won by substantial margins such as the current Balmain and Newtown and the former related seats such as Leichhardt, Phillip, Elizabeth, Rozelle and Port Jackson. With the loss of these reliable seats, this creates a harder task for Labor to form majority government into the future. The Greens have seen localised success in the Northern Rivers seat of Ballina which entirely encompasses the Byron Bay district.

'Blue Ribbon' and 'Hard Labor' electorates
The following lists current electorates where the opposing party (Liberal/National versus Labor/Greens) have never won each seat or its direct predecessor following a redistribution or since the abolition of proportional representation of the lower house in 1927:

Labor/Greens 
 Aurburn 
 Balmain 
 Bankstown 
 Canterbury 
 Fairfield 
 Lakemba 
 Liverpool   
 Mount Druitt 
 Newtown
 Shellharbour  
 Summer Hill 
 Wallsend
 Wollongong

  
Liberal 
 Baulkham Hills 
 Castle Hill 
 Davidson   
 Epping
 Hornsby
 Ku-ring-gai 
 North Shore
 Pittwater  
 Terrigal
 Vaucluse

  
Nationals  
 Clarence 
 Coffs Harbour
 Oxley 
 Port Macquarie
 Tamworth
 Upper Hunter

Note: Labor and Greens have been grouped together as it is historically evident that the electorates of Newtown and Balmain would likely never be won by a centre-right candidate and were held by the Labor party for nearly 80 years.

Marginal seats 
For governments to change hands, generally there is a quantity of marginal electorates that determine the result of the election which sustain the most attention from the major parties. In New South Wales, most of these electorates are located in Western Sydney and surrounds and generally after redistribution by the New South Wales Electoral Commission they remain marginal or ± 5% of the previous margin. In the case of electorates that more than often side with the incoming or continuing government, known as a bellwether, the electorate of Monaro holds the record for all but one (1995) election since 1927 in having sided with the government of the day, the other common bellwethers being Oatley (formerly Georges River) and Ryde (formerly Gladesville and Fuller). Other electorates that often change hands between the major parties include: Drummoyne, Gosford, Maitland, Heathcote, Holsworthy and Wollondilly.

Federal politics
New South Wales has 47 seats in the Australian House of Representatives, the most of any state. As such, it is nearly impossible to win government without a strong base in New South Wales, while a decent showing in New South Wales can usually make up for a poor night elsewhere. Labor has never won an election without winning a majority in New South Wales.

The 1996 federal election was an example of how critical New South Wales is in federal elections. The election turned into a Coalition rout in large part due to Labor losing 13 of its 33 seats in New South Wales.

Party support by region

Liberals  
Like at the state level, the federal party draws most of its continuous support from north-west Sydney and the surrounds of the Hawkesbury River. The Liberal Party of Australia has never lost the divisions of Berowra or Bradfield, on the northern side of the harbour. The Party also has strong bases in Southern Sydney and Southern NSW, having continuously held the divisions of Cook, Hughes (excluding party resignations), Farrer and Hume for several decades. The party lost its traditional harbour-side base of seats including North Sydney, Warringah, Warringah and Wentworth to the teal movement between 2018 and 2022.

Labor 
Unlike with state results, Labor has consistently maintained dominance over the Greens in the Inner West and the Liberals through the bulk of the Western Sydney basin to the Blue Mountains. The only inner-metropolitan Sydney seat that changes between Labor and Liberal is the division of Reid (formerly Lowe) which is currently held by Labor as of 2022. Labor dominate the Hunter, Illawarra and South Coast regions, as of 2022 holding every seat but the divisions of Gilmore, Hunter and Paterson are considered winnable seats for the Liberals in each region. The Central Coast seats of Dobell and Division of Robertson swing between both parties.

Notable New South Wales political figures
 Henry Parkes, 6th premier of New South Wales, longest-serving premier, regarded as the Father of Australian Federation
 Jack Lang, 23rd premier. Dismissed by the governor in 1932.
 Sir Robert Askin, 32nd premier, notable for his long tenure in office and corrupt behaviour.
 Nick Greiner, 37th premier. Widespread reforms and turbulent premiership.
 Bob Carr, 39th premier. Longest continual premiership and continued electoral success.

See also
 Premiers of New South Wales
 Governors of New South Wales

References